This article refers to the Chinese Strategic Petroleum Reserve. For other countries see global strategic petroleum reserves

The Strategic Petroleum Reserve (SPR) is an emergency fuel store of oil maintained by the People's Republic of China National Development and Reform Commission. China does not officially report its volume, but  the SPR was estimated to hold approximately 400 million barrels in total, out of a capacity of around 500 million barrels.

Background
In 2007 China announced an expansion of their crude reserves into a two part system. Chinese reserves would consist of a government-controlled strategic reserve complemented by mandated commercial reserves. The government-controlled reserves was completed in three phases. Phase one consisted of a 101.9 million barrel reserve, mostly completed by the end of 2008.  The second phase of the government-controlled reserves with an additional 170 million barrels for completion by 2011. Recently, Zhang Guobao the head of the National Energy Administration also stated that there will be a third phase that will expand reserves by 204 million barrels with the goal in 2009 of increasing China's SPR to 90 days of supply by 2020.

Reserve structure

Government reserves in 2009
The government and enterprise reserves are managed by the National Development and Reform Commission(NDRC). Current plans call for government reserves of 475.9 million barrels (101.9 million barrels completed, 374 million barrels planned).
First phase facilities:
Dalian, Liaoning Province. Capacity of 19 million barrels (3,000,000 m³), filled as of September 2009.
Qingdao, Shandong Province. Capacity of 19 million barrels (3,000,000 m³), filled as of September 2009.
Zhenhai, Zhejiang Province. 52 storage tanks with a capacity of 33 million barrels (5,200,000 m³), filled as of December 2007.
Zhoushan, Zhejiang Province. Capacity of 33 million barrels (5,200,000 m³),  filled as of June 2007.
Second phase facilities:
Dushanzi, Karamay City, Xinjiang Uygur Autonomous Region. Planned capacity of 34 million barrels (5,400,000 m³).
Lanzhou, Gansu province. Planned capacity of 19 million barrels (3,000,000 m³), with completion by 2011.
Huangdao, Shandong Province
Jinzhou, Liaoning Province
Four other facilities, location and size to be determined.
Third phase facilities:
Wanzhou, Chongqing Municipality
Henan Province
Caofeidian, Hebei Province
Tianjin. Planned capacity of 150 million barrels (20,000,000 m³), with completion by 2023.
Local government reserves
Guangdong Province has begun plans for an expanded reserve from 20 days to 90 days.
Hainan Province has begun plans for a reserve.
Shanshan, Xinjiang Uygur Autonomous Region has begun plans for a reserve.
Caofeidian, Hebei province has begun plans for a reserve.
Wanzhou, Chongqing municipality has begun plans for a reserve.

Enterprise reserves in 2008
Currently the enterprise reserves compose a smaller portion of the overall SPR with a 209.44 million barrel strategic reserve planned (35.33 million barrels completed, 51.5 million barrels under construction).
Commercial oil reserves by major Chinese oil companies, PetroChina, Sinopec and CNOOC
PetroChina facility, Shanshan County, Xinjiang Uygur Autonomous Region.
PetroChina facility, Tieling, Liaoning Province.
Sinopec facility, Ningbo, Zhejiang Province.
Sinopec facility, Rizhao, Shandong Province, under construction. Planned capacity of 20.1 million barrels (3,200,000 m³)
Sinopec facility, Beihai, Guangxi region, under construction. Planned capacity by 2011 of 20.1 million barrels (3,200,000 m³)
Sinopec facility, Zhanjiang, under construction
Sinopec facility, Caofeidian, under construction
Sinopec facility, Shanghai, under construction
Sinochem facility, under construction
Unknown company, Heilongjiang Province
CNOOC facility, Gansu Province, under construction.
Oil storage reserves by medium and small Chinese oil companies

The planned state reserves of 475.9 million barrels plus the planned enterprise reserves of 209.44 million barrels will provide around 90 days of consumption or a total of 685.34 million barrels.

Other SPRs in 2003

See also

 Strategic Petroleum Reserve (United States)
 Oil reserves
 Global strategic petroleum reserves
Energy development
Energy security

References

External links
 NDRC website

Petroleum economics
Petroleum in China
Energy security
Oil storage